The island of Ireland is divided in two jurisdictions: the Republic of Ireland and Northern Ireland.

 For the Republic of Ireland, see Telephone numbers in the Republic of Ireland and List of dialling codes in the Republic of Ireland
 For Northern Ireland, see Telephone numbers in the United Kingdom and List of dialling codes in the United Kingdom